Gannaput is a village, lying next to the Orange River in ZF Mgcawu District Municipality in the Northern Cape province of South Africa.

References

Populated places in the !Kheis Local Municipality